WOIZ (1130 AM, "Radio Antillas") is a radio station licensed to serve Guayanilla, Puerto Rico.  The station is owned by Radio Antillas, Inc. It airs a Spanish variety music format.

The station was assigned the WOIZ call letters by the Federal Communications Commission on March 12, 1985.

References

External links

OIZ
Radio stations established in 1986
Guayanilla, Puerto Rico
1986 establishments in Puerto Rico